The Muslim Students' Association (literally "Islamic Students' Association", abbreviated as HMI) is an Indonesian Muslim student organization. HMI is an independent organization with the objective of "connecting academics, creators – servants of Islam, and taking responsibility for creating a just people blessed by Allah".

History 
HMI was founded in Yogyakarta on 5 February 1947 at the initiative of Lafran Pane with 14 students from the Institute of Islam in Yogyakarta, currently Indonesian Islamic University.

References

External links
 Official website of HMI national committee

Islamic organizations based in Indonesia
Student organizations in Indonesia
Student organizations established in 1947